Madam Chief Minister is a 2021 Indian Hindi-language political drama film directed by Subhash Kapoor. The film stars Richa Chadda in the lead role. The film's official announcement was made by Chadda on 12 February 2020. The film was shot in Lucknow all through November and December 2019 in a straight start to finish 40-day schedule. The film was theatrically released in India on 22 January 2021.

Plot 
The movie Madam Chief Minister tells the story of Tara, a young woman from a lower caste who dreams of making a difference in her community. She joins a political party and works her way up through the ranks, eventually becoming a trusted aide to a senior leader. Despite her intelligence and hard work, Tara faces discrimination and prejudice from those around her, who view her caste as a barrier to success.

Despite the challenges, Tara is undeterred, and when the opportunity arises, she seizes it with both hands. She stands for election in her constituency and wins, becoming the youngest Chief Minister in the state’s history. However, her ascent to power is not without its challenges. She faces opposition from within her own party, as well as from other political parties and the media. There are also personal challenges, including her relationship with her boyfriend, who is a member of a higher caste.

The film explores the complexities and contradictions of Indian politics, including the pervasive influence of caste and the rampant corruption that is often a feature of political life. It also highlights the struggles of women in positions of power, who must navigate a male-dominated world and overcome entrenched biases and discrimination.

Cast 
 Richa Chadda as Chief Minister Tara Roopram: Danish's wife and Indramani's former girlfriend
 Manav Kaul as Danish Rehman Khan: Tara's husband and Shashi's fiancé
 Akshay Oberoi as Indramani "Indu" Tripathi: Tara's former boyfriend and enemy who left her and used her when she was twice been pregnant by his child.
 Saurabh Shukla as Master Surajbhan
 Subhrajyoti Barat as Arvind Singh
 Nikhil Vijay as Bablu
 Boloram Das as Sundar
 Sangam Bahuguna as Khushwaha
 Shreya Awasthi as Dr. Laxmi
 Raviza Chauhan as Shashi Rai, Danish's fiance
 Sushil Shukla as Ansari
 Vivek Yadav as Student 1
Raj Vardhan Pandey as Killer

Music 
The film's music was composed by Mangesh Dhakde while lyrics written by Dushyant.

Reception  
The film received three stars out of five from Ronak Kotecha and he described the film as "Madam Chief Minister gets our vote for being an entertaining political drama, set in the crime-infested corridors of power."

Controversy 
The movie’s portrayal of the lead was criticized for not choosing a Dalit woman. The actor responded “regrettable and a completely unintentional oversight”.

See also
 Maharani (web series)

References

External links
 
 

2021 films
2020s Hindi-language films
T-Series (company) films
Indian political drama films
2020s political drama films
2021 drama films